David Villabona Echalecu (born 5 December 1969) is a Spanish retired footballer who played mostly as a central midfielder.

During his professional career he played for both Real Sociedad and Athletic Bilbao, amassing La Liga totals of 221 matches and 13 goals over 15 seasons.

Villabona was a member of the Spanish side that won the gold medal at the 1992 Summer Olympics in Barcelona.

Club career
Villabona was born in Irun, Gipuzkoa. In a career blighted by injuries, he started playing professionally with Real Sociedad, but only amassed seven La Liga appearances in his first three seasons, being an undisputed starter however in 1989–90 as he helped the Basques to a final fifth place.

Subsequently, Villabona joined neighbours Athletic Bilbao, being regularly used at the beginning but very little in his final campaign, facing stiff competition from Josu Urrutia and youngster Julen Guerrero. His most steady period was lived at Racing de Santander, being a very important midfield element for the Cantabrians; due to recurrent injuries, however, he only appeared 12 times from 1997 to 2001 combined (none in the latter season as they finished second from the bottom), and retired at the age of 31.

Honours
Spain U23
Summer Olympic Games: 1992

References

External links

1969 births
Living people
Sportspeople from Irun
Spanish footballers
Footballers from the Basque Country (autonomous community)
Association football midfielders
La Liga players
Segunda División B players
Real Sociedad B footballers
Real Sociedad footballers
Athletic Bilbao footballers
Racing de Santander players
Spain youth international footballers
Spain under-21 international footballers
Spain under-23 international footballers
Footballers at the 1992 Summer Olympics
Olympic footballers of Spain
Olympic gold medalists for Spain
Olympic medalists in football
Medalists at the 1992 Summer Olympics
Basque Country international footballers